The HAL HPT-32 Deepak ("lamp" in Sanskrit) is an Indian prop-driven primary trainer manufactured by Hindustan Aeronautics Limited. It has two seats in side-by-side configuration.

Operational history
The Deepak is used for primary training, observation, liaison and target towing.

When it flies upside-down fuel flows from a collector tank in the fuselage and the inverted flight is limited to 1 min. Deepak has a theoretical glide ratio of 8.5:1. The IAF and HAL are looking into new safety systems such as Ballistic Recovery Systems to enable it to descend safely in the event of an engine failure. On 16 May 2010 the IAF cleared the installation of a parachute recovery system. The HPT-32 aircraft has been replaced by the Pilatus PC-7 Mk II in the IAF, as its workhorse as a Basic Trainer Aircraft (BTA) in 2013.

Accidents

In 17 Deepak crashes so far, 19 pilots have died. The Comptroller and Auditor General (CAG) of India has been reported as saying the aircraft is "technologically outdated and beset by flight safety hazards" when discussing the grounding of the fleet in 2009. HAL HTT-40 is going replace HAL HPT-32 Deepak as primary trainer.

Versions
HPT-32
Basic version.
HTT-34
Turboprop version, powered by  Allison 250-B17D engine. First flew on 17 June 1984.

Operators

 Indian Air Force
 Indian Navy 8  for basic training

Specifications (HPT-32)

See also

HAL HTT-40

References

Notes

Bibliography

Taylor, M.J.H. (ed,). Brassey's World Aircraft Systems Directory 1999/2000 Edition. London: Brassey's, 1999. .

Deepak
1970s Indian military trainer aircraft
Single-engined tractor aircraft
Low-wing aircraft
Aircraft first flown in 1977